Fanseat is an Internet streaming service specializing in live sports broadcasts, established in 2015. Early on, it served as an online extension of Fanseat 1 and 2 (later Fanseat 1 to 4), basic tier television channels available to customers of Finnish telecommunications provider Elisa. In 2017, the Fanseat channels were renamed and merged into a new 8-channel premium tier called Elisa Viihde Sport. The online version of Fanseat remained its own brand, and was refocused on foreign markets.
In 2019, the platform was acquired by Spring Media, a Swedish sports marketing agency.
Fanseat's managing director is Jean-Maël Gineste, a former sales director at Eurosport.

Fanseat mostly caters to small-market sports leagues, but has also held out-of-market rights to some internationally recognized properties. Most events are available through a monthly subscription, with select programming being offered on pay-per-view basis.

Fanseat can be viewed via web browsers on PC and Mac, as well as apps on Apple iOS and Android devices.

Programming
Broadcasts are restricted to specific regions per the terms of each rights agreement, unless otherwise noted.

Basketball 
 National Basketball League
 Chinese Basketball Association
 Basketligaen (worldwide)
 LNB Pro A
 Basketball Bundesliga
 Lietuvos krepšinio lyga
 Liga ACB

Football 
 2022 FIFA World Cup Asian Qualifiers
 AFC Champions League
 AFC Cup
 Damallsvenskan
 UAE Pro League

Ice hockey 
 Champions Hockey League
 Ekstraliga
 Extraliga
 Ligue Magnus
 Latvijas Virslīgas

Motorsports 
 Ligue Nationale de Speedway (worldwide)
 Speedway GB Premiership
 ElitSpeedway Sweden

Other 
 MCA T20 Super Series

Former programming

Basketball
 2017 FIBA EuroBasket Qualifiers (select teams)
 Basketball Champions League
 FIBA Europe Cup
 VTB United League
 Pro Basketball League
 Korisliiga
 Svenska Basketligan

Football
 2016 UEFA Euro Qualifiers
 2015 UEFA European Under-21 Championship
 Superliga
 Meistriliiga
 Naisten Liiga
 Ykkonen
 Allsvenskan

Ice Hockey
 2018 Women's Olympic Qualifiers (select teams)
 Mestis
 1. Hokejova Liga
 Swedish Hockey League

Team handball
 BENE-League Handball

Volleyball
 Lentopallon Mestaruusliiga

Other
 IFF Champions Cup
 Euro Floorball Tour
 2017 ELF European Box Lacrosse Championships
 2017 IIHF Inline Hockey World Championships
 Salibandyliiga
 National Lacrosse League

References

External links
Official website

2015 introductions
Television channels and stations established in 2015
Defunct television channels in Finland
Internet properties established in 2015
Internet television streaming services
Subscription video streaming services